Amy Zongo-Filet, better known by her birthname Amy Zongo, (born October 4, 1980) is a French athlete who specialises in the triple jump. Zongo competed at the 2006 European Athletics Championships, 2002 European Athletics Indoor Championships and the 2009 European Athletics Indoor Championships.

Prize List 

French National Athletic Championships :
winner of triple jump in 2001, 2003, 2004, 2005 et 2006 
French Indoors National Athletic Championships :
winner of triple jump in 2002

Competition record

References

External links
 Biography(fr) of Amy Zongo on the site of  la Fédération française d'athlétisme
 

French female triple jumpers
1980 births
Living people
Sportspeople from Marseille
Competitors at the 2003 Summer Universiade
Athletes (track and field) at the 2001 Mediterranean Games
Athletes (track and field) at the 2005 Mediterranean Games
Athletes (track and field) at the 2009 Mediterranean Games
Mediterranean Games competitors for France